The 2014–15 season was Società Sportiva Calcio Napoli's 69th season in Serie A. The team competed in Serie A, the Coppa Italia, the UEFA Champions League, the UEFA Europa League, and the Supercoppa Italiana.

Players

Squad information

Transfers

In

Out

Pre-season and friendlies

Competitions

Supercoppa Italiana

Serie A

League table

Results summary

Results by round

Matches

Coppa Italia

UEFA Champions League

Play-off round

UEFA Europa League

Group stage

Knockout phase

Round of 32

Round of 16

Quarter-finals

Semi-finals

Statistics

Appearances and goals

|-
! colspan="14" style="background:#5DAFE3; color:#FFFFFF; text-align:center"| Goalkeepers

|-
! colspan="14" style="background:#5DAFE3; color:#FFFFFF; text-align:center"| Defenders

|-
! colspan="14" style="background:#5DAFE3; color:#FFFFFF; text-align:center"| Midfielders

|-
! colspan="14" style="background:#5DAFE3; color:#FFFFFF; text-align:center"| Forwards

|-
! colspan="14" style="background:#5DAFE3; color:#FFFFFF; text-align:center"| Players transferred out during the season

Goalscorers

Last updated: 31 May 2015

Clean sheets

Disciplinary record

References

S.S.C. Napoli seasons
Napoli
Napoli
Napoli